The Leicester Riders are an English women's basketball team based in Loughborough, that compete in the WBBL, the top league of British women's basketball.

History
The Riders' programme was founded in 2011 at Loughborough University, and entered the National Basketball League Division Two in its first season. In that inaugural season, the Riders finished second in the league and won the post-season playoffs, earning promotion to Division One which at the time was the highest level of women's basketball in the United Kingdom.

In 2014, the Riders were founder members of the newly established Women's British Basketball League and the programme became known as the Leicester Riders, in closer partnership with the club. The Riders won their first WBBL title in 2018, winning the first of three consecutive WBBL Trophy titles. The Riders won their first WBBL Cup in 2021, defeating the Sevenoaks Suns in the final in Manchester.

Honours
 WBBL Trophy (3): 2017-18, 2018–19, 2019–20
 WBBL Cup (1):  2020-21 
 NBL Division One Playoffs (1): 2013-14 
 NBL Division Two Playoffs (1): 2011-12

Season-by-season records

Players

Current roster

References

See also
Leicester Riders (men)

Women's basketball teams in England
Basketball teams established in 2011
Women's British Basketball League teams
2011 establishments in England
Sport in Loughborough
Loughborough University